Virginie Klès (born 18 August 1961) is a former member of the Senate of France. She represented the Ille-et-Vilaine department, and is related to the Socialist Party.

Biography
Toxicological veterinarian by profession, Virginia Klès was elected mayor of Châteaubourg (Ille-et-Vilaine) following the municipal elections of 2001 in a three-way race against the exiting mayor and a socialist candidate. She was re-elected in 2008. She then became vice-president of the  Communauté d'agglomération de Vitré-Communauté. She was elected senator on September 21, 2008 and did not run for reelection in 2014.

References

1961 births
Living people
French Senators of the Fifth Republic
Socialist Party (France) politicians
Women members of the Senate (France)
Senators of Ille-et-Vilaine